Alberto Jiménez (born 8 April 1969) is a Mexican former professional boxer who competed from 1988 to 2000. He held the WBO flyweight title from 1995 to 1996, making six title defences.

Professional career
In June 1991, Alberto won the Mexican National flyweight title by beating veteran Gonzalo Villalobos.

WBC Flyweight Championship
In his first world title attempt, he lost a very disputed twelve round majority decision to Muangchai Kittikasem in Lumpinee Boxing Stadium, Bangkok, Thailand.

WBO Flyweight Championship
On February 11, 1995, Jiménez won the WBO flyweight title by upsetting South Africa's Jacob Matlala with an eighth round T.K.O. in Carousel Casino, Hammanskraal, Gauteng, South Africa.

See also
List of Mexican boxing world champions
List of WBO world champions
List of world flyweight boxing champions

References

External links

Boxers from Mexico City
World boxing champions
World Boxing Organization champions
World flyweight boxing champions
Flyweight boxers
1969 births
Living people
Mexican male boxers